Christianae may refer to :

Christianae Religionis Institutio is John Calvin's seminal work on Protestant systematic theology.
Christianae Reipublicae is an encyclical of Pope Clement XIII of 1766 on the dangers of anti-Christian writings.
Disputationes de Controversiis Christianae Fidei adversus hujus temporis Haereticos is a work on dogmatics by Robert Bellarmine. 
Sapientiae Christianae is an 1890 encyclical of Pope Leo XIII.
Sodalitium Christianae Vitae is a Society of Apostolic Life founded by Luis Fernando Figari in 1971. 
Vigiliae Christianae is a review of early Christian life and language.